Daniel Garrett Mitchell is a retired United States Army major general who last served as the Commanding General of the United States Army Sustainment Command from June 24, 2020, to May 27, 2021. Previously, he served as the Commanding General of the United States Army Tank-automotive and Armaments Command. Mitchell attended the United States Military Academy, graduating with a B.S. degree in mechanical engineering in 1985. He later earned master's degrees from the Naval Postgraduate School and the Army War College.

References

External links

Year of birth missing (living people)
Living people
Place of birth missing (living people)
United States Military Academy alumni
Naval Postgraduate School alumni
United States Army War College alumni
United States Army generals